TVA, the Tennessee Valley Authority, is an entity providing various services in the southern United States since its establishment in 1933. 

TVA may also refer to:

Businesses and organizations
Tibetan Volunteers for Animals
Toronto Vegetarian Association
Groupe TVA, Inc., a Canadian communications company

Television
Televisão Abril, now Vivo TV, a Brazilian television service provider
TV Aichi, a Japanese television station
TVA (Albania), a defunct television station based in Tirana
TVA (Andorra), a television broadcaster
TVA (Canadian TV network), a French-language television network
TVA Vicenza, an Italian television channel

Other uses
Taxe sur la valeur ajoutée, the French term for Value added tax
Telephone VoIP adapter
Time Variance Authority, a fictional organization in the Marvel Comics
 Time Variance Authority (Marvel Cinematic Universe), the Marvel Cinematic Universe counterpart
Transverse abdominal muscle
Tubulovillous adenoma, a type of intestinal polyp
TVA v. Hill, a Supreme Court case filed under the Endangered Species Act

See also